La Calaca Comelona is a Mexican restaurant in Portland, Oregon.

Description
La Calaca Comelona (English: "The Hungry Skeleton") is a Mexican restaurant on Belmont Street in southeast Portland's Buckman neighborhood. Patricia Cabrera is the chef and owner. The restaurant has a skeletal decor and a "secret" garden. According to Michael Russell of The Oregonian, the restaurant is "known for lush back patio, house-made salsas and authentic dishes representing multiple regions of Mexico". The menu includes three varieties of alambre, mole, papitas, quesadillas, and tacos.

Reception
In her 2016 overview of Portland's 25 best Mexican restaurants, Samantha Bakall described La Calaca Comelona as "regional Mexican food and good cocktails in a restaurant as obsessed with skeletons as a Dia De Los Muertos parade".

See also

 Hispanics and Latinos in Portland, Oregon
 List of Mexican restaurants

References

External links

 
 La Calaca Comelona at Portland Monthly
 La Calaca Comelona at Zomato

Buckman, Portland, Oregon
Mexican restaurants in Portland, Oregon